The Purple Album is the third album by Purple City, released on May 23, 2006 through Babygrande Records.

Track listing
"Live Your Life" – 2:29
"Gangsta" – 3:58
"Fly High" – 3:21
"Trap Nigga" – 4:00
"Go Head" – 4:40
"Harlem to B-More" – 4:03
"Nick Nack" – 4:03
"Bank Roll" – 5:39
"Hustlers" – 4:20
"Purple City and the Lot" – 3:38
"Picture Me Rollin" – 3:55
"Head Bust Open" – 3:58
"P.A.Y.D.A.Y." – 5:09
"Grind Slow" – 3:57
"Catch Him" – 2:52

Chart history

2006 albums
Babygrande Records albums
Purple City Productions albums
Albums produced by Agallah